Wood opal is a form of petrified wood which has developed an opalescent sheen or, more rarely, where the wood has been completely replaced by opal. Other names for this opalized sheen-like wood are opalized wood and opalized petrified wood. It is often used as a gemstone.

References

Opals
Gemstones